Al Hokair Land was an amusement park in al-Hamra neighborhood of Riyadh, Saudi Arabia. Founded in 2002, it was considered as one of the most popular recreational spots of the city. It was closed in April 2021.

History
The amusement park opened in 2002. In late April 2021, popular entertainment magazine Screen Mix reported the beginning of the amusement park's demolition through its Twitter handle.

See also
 Tourism in Saudi Arabia

References

2002 establishments in Saudi Arabia
Amusement parks opened in 2002
Amusement parks in Saudi Arabia
Defunct amusement parks
Parks in Riyadh
Tourist attractions in Riyadh